Congregations of the Precious Blood can refer to:

 Bernadines of the Precious Blood - A congregation of nuns, no longer in existence, founded by Mother Ballou with the assistance of St. Francis de Sales, as an offshoot of the reformed Cistercianesses
 Daughters of the Precious Blood - A congregation of nuns established in the Netherlands 1862
 Sister Adorers of the Precious Blood - A congregation of nuns established in Quebec 1861
 Sisters of the Precious Blood (Baden) - A Roman Catholic female religious order founded in Gurtweil, Baden in 1857 
 Sisters of the Precious Blood (Switzerland) - A Roman Catholic female religious order founded in Grisons, Switzerland in 1833
 Missionaries of the Precious Blood